Gaocheng is one of eight districts of the prefecture-level city of Shijiazhuang, the capital of Hebei Province, North China, on the upper reaches of the Hutuo River.

History
In 113 BCE, during the Western Han Dynasty, Cheng County was established, and renamed as Gaocheng County during the Yuan Dynasty. The present county-level was established in July 1989.

Administrative divisions
There are 13 towns and 1 township.

Towns:
Lianzhou, Gangshang, Nandong, Xing'an, Nanmeng, Meihua, Chang'an, Zengcun, Xiguan, Zhangjiazhuang, Jiashizhuang, Qiutou, Nanying

Townships:
Jiumen Hui Ethnic Township

Climate

Transport
Shijiazhuang−Dezhou railway
G1811 Huanghua−Shijiazhuang Expressway
China National Highway 307

References

External links
 Gaocheng Window, official government page

 
County-level divisions of Hebei
Shijiazhuang